Bell's Life... was a group of newspapers produced in Australia in the mid-nineteenth century based upon the English publication Bell's Life in London.

Most publications lasted a short duration.  The subtitles were usually sporting chronicle.

The Sydney and Melbourne papers were precursors of the Australasian Post.

Sydney
In Sydney, New South Wales it was known as Bell's Life in Sydney and Sporting Reviewer and had a longer publication run of 1845 to 1872. Stories and articles from the Sydney paper were carried by other newspapers.

Hobart
In Tasmania, the subtitle was the more extensive sporting chronicle, agricultural gazette and country journal.

Melbourne
In Melbourne, Victoria the publication was titled "Victoria", rather than the city name.

Adelaide
In Adelaide, South Australia, the publication lasted for less than a year.

Perth
The publication in Perth, Western Australia came later than other Australian versions in the 1890s, with an added phrase in the subtitle of society journal.

References

Defunct newspapers published in Australia